In the 2014 season, Djurgårdens IF competed in the Allsvenskan and Svenska Cupen. Per Olsson took over from Per-Mathias Høgmo as manager, after the Norwegian left the club to coach the Norway national football team. Djurgården finished 7th in Allsvenskan and in the groups stage of Svenska Cupen

Squad information

Squad
 
 updated November 7, 2014.

 

|}

Transfers

In

Out

|}

Incidents

Helsingborgs IF vs. Djurgårdens IF
The season-opening Allsvenskan match at Olympia against Helsingborgs IF on 30 March 2014 was abandoned after 42 minutes of play, with the score at that time being 1–1. Djurgården fans invaded the pitch after reports that a Djurgården fan had died from injuries sustained in an assault outside the arena before the beginning of the match. The assault occurred at the Kärnan medieval tower. The death of the 43-year-old man was confirmed by the Skåne police. This was the first football-related death in Sweden since 2002, when IFK Göteborg supporter Tony Deogan was killed in Stockholm in a clash with AIK supporters. Another four people also sustained injuries in connection to the match. The decision was made to abandon the match. On 14 April 2014, the Swedish Football Association's (SFA) disciplinary committee decided that the match would not continue and that it would end with the score 1–1. According to the committee, the decision was taken in respect of the man killed.

Two days after the death, a 28-year-old man from Helsingborg was arrested. On 16 June 2014, the Helsingborg District Court sentenced him to eight months in prison for assault and involuntary manslaughter.

Club

Coaching staff

Other information

Player statistics 
Appearances for competitive matches only. Updated as of 29 October2014

|}

Goals

Assists

Competitions

Overall

Allsvenskan

League table

Results summary

Results by round

Matches
Kickoff times are in UTC+2 unless stated otherwise.

Svenska Cupen

2013–14
The tournament continued from the 2013 season.

Kickoff times are in UTC+2.

Group stage

2014–15
The tournament continues into the 2015 season.
Kickoff times are in UTC+2.

Qualification stage

Non competitive

Pre-season
Kickoff times are in UTC+2 unless stated otherwise.

References

Djurgardens
Djurgårdens IF Fotboll seasons